Tebogo Sembowa (born 7 February 1988) is a Botswana footballer who plays for Jwaneng Galaxy and has been capped for the Botswana national team.

International career

International goals
Scores and results list Botswana's goal tally first.

References

External links
 

1988 births
Living people
Botswana international footballers
Botswana footballers
Notwane F.C. players
Township Rollers F.C. players
Gaborone United S.C. players
Jwaneng Galaxy F.C. players
Association football forwards